Hanrie Louw (birth 15 December 2001) is a South African field hockey player for the South African national team.

Personal life
Hanrie Louw attended Die Hoërskool Menlopark,  studied at the University of Pretoria.

International career

Under–21
Louw made her debut for the South Africa U–21 in 2022 at the FIH Junior World Cup in Potchefstroom.

National team
Louw participated at the Hockey Africa Cup of Nations and the 2022 Women's FIH Hockey World Cup. Shortly after this announcement, she was also named in the squad for the Commonwealth Games in Birmingham.

References

External links

Hanrie Louw is 2022 Commonwealth Games in Birmingham

2001 births
Living people
South African female field hockey players
Female field hockey midfielders
TuksHockey Club players
Field hockey players at the 2022 Commonwealth Games
21st-century South African women